Owl Club is a social club in Cape Town, South Africa, for people interested in arts and sciences.

Owl Club may also refer to:

 Owl Club (Harvard), an all-male club at Harvard University
 Owls club (Tucson, Arizona), an historic building in Tucson, Arizona